The First Era of Northern Domination refers to the period of Vietnamese history during which present-day northern Vietnam was under the rule of the Han dynasty and the Xin dynasty.

In 111 BC, the powerful Han dynasty conquered Nanyue during its expansion southward and incorporated what is now northern Vietnam, together with much of modern Guangdong and Guangxi , into the expanding Han empire. Vietnamese resistance to Han rule culminated in the rebellion of the Trưng sisters, who expelled the Han in 40 AD and briefly ruled Vietnam until being defeated by the returning Han Chinese army in 43 AD.

Background

Pre-sinification Yue Identity 

Due to the fact that the Han Dynasty did not keep detailed records of the personal and cultural identities of the Yue people, much of the information now known is in relation to their political and governmental roles that the Imperial Han court came into contact with by means of trade and colonization.

Those who were referred to as Yue may not have claimed the identity signifier for themselves, so much as that it was a term placed onto them and their culture by outside forces. There is not one “Yue” culture as the term encompassed several different groups of people with varying cultural identities that ranged throughout the East Asian mainland and what is now considered the southern Chinese Provinces and Northern Vietnam. People native to the southernmost territories were referred to as the “Hundred Yue” which references the numerous different cultures included in this one identity.

Qin campaigns against Yue kingdoms 

After Qin Shi Huang defeated the state of Chu in 223 BC, Qin dynasty in 221 BC undertook a military campaign against the Baiyue in Lingnan to conquer the territories of what is now southern China and northern Vietnam. The emperor ordered his armies of five hundred thousand men to advance southward in the five columns to conquer and annex the Yue territories into the Qin empire. By 214 BC, Guangdong, Guangxi, and parts of northern Vietnam were subjugated and annexed into the Qin Empire. However, Chinese domination was brief and the collapse of the Qin dynasty led the Yue tribes to regain their independence.

Formation of Nanyue  
Following the collapse of the Qin dynasty, Zhao Tuo, a general of the Qin dynasty, took advantage of the Qin’s decline and the South region's crumbling political structure to set up his own kingdom, Nanyue. Nanyue was centered on Panyu (modern-day Guangzhou) and stretched from present-day Vietnam to modern-day Hunan. Despite coming from the North, Zhao Tuo assimilated into the Yue culture and created a new identity as the King of Nanyue. Zhao Tuo identified himself as Yue, married a Yue woman, incorporated locals into his army and even fought off Han invasions later on to protect his kingdom. He was able to successfully pull away from his past and make a name for himself in Vietnamese history. Some historians do not see him as a foreign conqueror, but as the defender of Vietnam against the Han Chinese, the legitimacy of the Triệu dynasty would be the source of debate and controversies among Vietnamese historians. Nevertheless, Zhaotuo sought to extend his territory further south to the Red River Delta region. 

Even with Zhao Tuo’s commitment to assimilate, Chinese influences were still introduced to the Yue people. He brought the Han materialistic culture with him to Nanyue leading to a fusion of Han and Yue art styles in music, handcrafts, and motifs. Artifacts uncovered from the Nanyue Kingdom display the cultural mix between the two cultures, especially from the tomb of Zhao Mo which displayed Han grandeur. Besides Zhao Tuo, the Han court and other Chinese people who migrated to the South have also influenced Yue culture.  Despite being autonomous from the Han Dynasty, Chinese influences were still prominent in Nanyue. The kingdom was a vassalage to the Han, and often had to make tributes leading to constant interactions. Furthermore, the Nanyue kingdom’s elites were a mix of Northern people who moved to the south and the former Yue elite bringing a mixing of cultures. The elites during this time became culturally dual and would later take advantage of their skills during the Han conquest as the link between the Yue and Han Chinese.

One of the main reasons why the Yue culture became so heavily intermingled with Chinese culture was because there were not definitive borders that declared where the southernmost region of China ended and where the territory of the Yue peoples began. Chinese farmers were compelled to move farther and farther south because the climate and terrain were more conducive for their crops. As they crossed the seemingly imaginary border, more and more farmers became acquainted with the Yue peoples and their cultures. This indefinite border made it so that the Chinese culture and the Yue peoples intersected and influenced each other. This would eventually be  a contributing factor for why the Chinese empires would travel south to conquer the Yue peoples and assume their land.

History

Han conquest of Nanyue

In 196 BC, Emperor Gaozu sent Lu Jia on a diplomatic mission to Nanyue to officially recognize Zhao Tuo. Nevertheless, relations between Han and Nanyue were sometimes strained. Zhao Tuo resented Empress Lü's ban on exports of metal wares and female livestock to Nanyue. In 183 BC, he proclaimed himself the "Martial Emperor of the Southern Yue" (南越武帝), which implied a perceived status on equal footing with the Han emperor. Two years later, Nanyue attacked the Changsha Kingdom, a constituent kingdom of the Han empire. In 180 BC, Lu Jia led a diplomatic mission to Nanyue that succeeded in convincing Zhao Tuo to give up on his title as emperor and pay homage to Han as a nominal vassal.

In 135 BC, King Zhao Mo of Nanyue appealed to the Han court for help against attacking Minyue forces. The Han court responded swiftly and this led to Zhao Mo's agreement to send his son, Prince Zhao Yingqi, to serve in the palace at Chang'an. At the Nanyue court in 113 BC, the Queen Dowager of Nanyue suggested incorporating Nanyue as a kingdom under the suzerainty of the Han empire, thus formally integrating the kingdom on the same terms as the other kingdoms of the Han empire. She was Chinese herself and was married to Zhao Yingqi. However, many Nanyue ministers opposed this suggestion. Lü Jia was the primary Nanyue official to oppose the idea and he led the opposition against the Queen Dowager. In 112 BC, the opposition retaliated violently and executed the Queen Dowager, a provocation that led to the mobilization of a large Han naval force into Nanyue.

The Han forces comprised six armies, who traveled by sea, directly southward, or from Sichuan along the Xi River. In 111 BC, General Lu Bode and General Yang Pu advanced towards Panyu (present-day Guangzhou). This resulted in the surrender of Nanyue to the Han empire later that year.

Sinicization 
During the next several hundred years of Chinese rule, sinicization of the newly conquered Nanyue was brought about by a combination of Han imperial military power, regular settlement and an influx of Han Chinese refugees, officers and garrisons, merchants, scholars, bureaucrats, fugitives, and prisoners of war. At the same time, Chinese officials were interested in exploiting the region's natural resources and trade potential. In addition, Han Chinese officials seized fertile land conquered from Vietnamese nobles for newly settled Han Chinese immigrants. Han rule and government administration brought new influences to the indigenous Vietnamese and the rule of Vietnam as a Chinese province operated as a frontier outpost of the Han Empire. The Han dynasty was desperate to extend their control over the fertile Red River Delta, in part as the geographical terrain served as a convenient supply point and trading post for Han ships engaged in the growing maritime trade with various South and Southeast Asian Kingdoms as well as establishing it as a prominent trading post with India and the Roman Empire. The Han dynasty relied heavily on trade with the Nanyue who produced unique items such as: bronze and pottery incense burners, ivory, and rhinoceros horns. The Han dynasty took advantage of the Yue people’s goods and used them in their maritime trade network that extended from Lingnan through Yunnan to Burma and India.

During the first century of Chinese rule, Vietnam was governed leniently and indirectly with no immediate change in indigenous policies. Initially, indigenous Lac Viet people were governed at the local level but with indigenous Vietnamese local officials being replaced with newly settled Han Chinese officials. Han imperial bureaucrats generally pursued a policy of peaceful relations with the indigenous population, focusing their administrative roles in the prefectural headquarters and garrisons, and maintaining secure river routes for trade. By the first century AD, however, the Han dynasty intensified its efforts to assimilate its new territories by raising taxes and instituting marriage and land inheritance reforms aimed at turning Vietnam into a patriarchal society more amenable to political authority.

The native Luo chief paid heavy tributes and imperial taxes to the Han mandarins to maintain the local administration and the military. The Chinese vigorously tried to assimilate the Vietnamese either through forced signification or through brute Chinese political domination. The Han dynasty sought to assimilate the Vietnamese as the Chinese wanted to maintain a unified cohesive empire through a "civilizing mission" as the Chinese regarded the Vietnamese as uncultured and backward barbarians with the Chinese regarding their "Celestial Empire" as the supreme centre of the universe. Under Chinese rule, Han dynasty officials imposed Chinese culture, including Taoism and Confucianism, its imperial examination system, and mandarin bureaucracy. However, implementation of a foreign administrative system and sinicization was not easy as frequent uprisings and rebellions were indicative of Vietnamese resistance to these changes.

Some Vietnamese welcomed the chance to assimilate as they considered Chinese culture to be a more civilized, advanced and superior culture. Though the Vietnamese incorporated advanced and technical elements they thought would be beneficial to themselves, the general unwillingness to be dominated by outsiders, the desire to maintain political autonomy and the drive to regain Vietnamese independence signified Vietnamese resistance and hostility to Chinese aggression, political domination and imperialism on Vietnamese society. Han Chinese bureaucrats sought to impose Chinese high culture onto the indigenous Vietnamese including bureaucratic Legalist techniques and Confucian ethics, education, art, literature, and language. The conquered and subjugated Vietnamese had to adopt the Chinese writing system, Confucianism and veneration of the Chinese emperor to the detriment of their native spoken language, culture, ethnicity and national identity.

Trung sisters' uprising

In March 40 AD, the Trưng sisters, Trưng Trắc (徵側; Zheng Ce) and Trưng Nhị (徵貳; Zheng Er), led the Lac Viet people to rise up in the Trưng sisters' rebellion against the Han in Jiaozhi. It began at the Red River Delta, but soon spread to other Yue tribes along the coast to the north and south. The uprising gained the support of about sixty-five towns and settlements. Trung Trac was proclaimed as the queen. Even though she gained control over the countryside, she was not able to capture the fortified towns.

A military campaign led by Han general Ma Yuan from 42 AD to 43 AD led to the Han reconquest of the region, leading to the capture and decaptiation of the Trưng sisters and the start of the Second Era of Northern Domination.

Administration
In 111 BC, the Han dynasty defeated the successors of Zhao Tuo and annexed Nanyue and the former Âu Lạc into the Han empire. Following annexation, the name of Jiaozhi (Giao Chỉ) was established, dividing the former kingdom into nine commanderies with the last three commonly used in modern Vietnamese history books:

Nanhai (南海; Vietnamese: Nam Hải; located in Lingnan, modern central Guangdong)
Hepu (合浦; Vietnamese: Hợp Phố; located in Lingnan, modern southern coastal Guangxi)
Cangwu (蒼梧; Vietnamese: Thương Ngô; located in Lingnan, modern eastern Guangxi)
Yulin (郁林/鬱林; Vietnamese: Uất Lâm; located in Lingnan, modern Guangxi)
Zhuya (珠崖; Vietnamese: Châu Nhai; located on Hainan)
Dan'er (儋耳; Vietnamese: Đạm Nhĩ; located on Hainan),
Jiaozhi (交趾; Vietnamese: Giao Chỉ; located in northern Vietnam and part of southern Guangxi)
Jiuzhen (九真; Vietnamese: Cửu Chân; located in central Vietnam)
Rinan (日南; Vietnamese: Nhật Nam; located in central Vietnam)

All nine districts were administered from Long Biên, near modern Hanoi; each ruled by a Chinese mandarin while the old system of lower rank rulers of Lac Hau, Lac Tuong were kept unchanged.

Population
Population censuses in 2 AD in modern-day Northern Vietnam are showed as below.

See also
Vietnam under Chinese rule
Timeline of Vietnam under Chinese rule

References

Sources

  
  
 
  
 
  
  
  
  
 
 
  
 
 
 
  
  
 
   
  
  
 
 
 

States and territories disestablished in the 1st century
111 BC
110s BC establishments
40 disestablishments
2nd century BC in China
2nd century BC in Vietnam
1st century BC in China
1st century BC in Vietnam
1st century in China
1st century in Vietnam
China–Vietnam relations
Han dynasty
History of Vietnam